Phrazes for the Young is the debut solo album by American singer-songwriter Julian Casablancas. It was released through his own Cult Records label, via RCA and Rough Trade Records, on November 2, 2009, in the United Kingdom and the following day in the United States.

Casablancas, who is best known for being the front man of New York City-based rock band the Strokes, recorded the eight-song album in 2009 in New York City, Los Angeles, and Omaha, Nebraska. Jason Lader and Mike Mogis (the latter of Bright Eyes and Monsters of Folk) served as producers. The album title is a reference to Oscar Wilde's "Phrases and Philosophies for the Use of the Young". Casablancas' dog, Balki, is pictured on the album sleeve.

Critical reception was mostly positive, although Casablancas has since expressed regret about the project, stating, "I had all these different ideas, [but] I thought 'if I go too weird, people won’t take it seriously,' so I did the safest ideas [...] And then… maybe it became this 'oh, this is what he does when he’s on his own' vs. The Strokes, and that was annoying, frustrating.”

Release
The album was previewed in its entirety on August 31, 2009, at the Duo Music Exchange in Tokyo, Japan. To celebrate the release, Casablancas played a special series of shows every Friday night in November in Los Angeles. The first track released from the album, "11th Dimension", had its first airing on the Radio 1 Zane Lowe Show on September 17, and was marked as Zane Lowe's Hottest Record. The single was released on October 2, 2009, in the US.

Casablancas performed "I Wish It Was Christmas Today" (based on a Saturday Night Live skit) on Late Night with Jimmy Fallon on December 21, 2009. "Left & Right in the Dark", "Out of the Blue", "Ludlow St" and "11th Dimension" are featured in the Gossip Girl episode "The Lady Vanished"; "Out of the Blue" was featured in the trailer of The Kids Are All Right; and "11th Dimension" was featured in the opening of the 2015 comedy Vacation.

A deluxe box set including B-sides and home recordings was made available after the album's release. It comes with a vinyl recording of the album and is housed within an antique style box.

Track listing

Personnel

Julian Casablancas – vocals, all instruments, songwriting
Jason Lader – all instruments, production

Additional musicians
Jen Turner – guitar on "Glass"
Lenny Castro – additional percussion on "Ludlow St." intro; shaker on "11th Dimension"; sleigh bell on "Glass"; tambourine on "Out of the Blue"
Nate Walcott – horns on "Tourist"; additional horns on "Ludlow St."
Adam MacDougall – organs on "4 Chords of the Apocalypse"
Blake Mills – guitar on "4 Chords of the Apocalypse", "Ludlow St." and "11th Dimension"
Mike Mogis – guitar on "Tourist"

Technical personnel
Jason Lader – production
Mike Mogis – additional production
Ray Aldaco – additional engineering
Brian Sperber – mixing engineering
Brian Gardner – mastering
Steve Falone – mastering

Design
Julian Casablancas and Warren Fu – art direction & concept
Warren Fu – art designer
Williams + Hirakawa – photography

Charts

References

2009 debut albums